Fredrik Teodor Koskenniemi (5 November 1887, Vihti – 15 March 1965) was a Finnish athlete who competed mainly in the cross country team event during his career. He competed for Finland at the 1920 Summer Olympics held in Antwerp, Belgium where he won the gold medal in the Men's Cross Country Team event with his teammates Paavo Nurmi and Heikki Liimatainen.

References

External links
sports-reference

1887 births
1965 deaths
People from Vihti
Finnish male long-distance runners
Olympic gold medalists for Finland
Athletes (track and field) at the 1920 Summer Olympics
Olympic athletes of Finland
Medalists at the 1920 Summer Olympics
Olympic gold medalists in athletics (track and field)
Olympic cross country runners
Sportspeople from Uusimaa